"Blind" is a song by American singer-songwriter SZA (also known as Solana Rowe) and the sixth track on her second studio album, SOS (2022). "Blind" is categorized as an R&B song with influences from the Folk-pop genre."Blind" was produced by Carter Lang, Rob Bisel, Will Miller and Margaux Alexis Rosalena Whitney (also known as Yuli) and written by Solana Rowe and her producers. The song's lyrics discuss how the toxicity of her previous relationships have negatively affected her reputation and self-esteem and was even claimed to be part of the best lyrics from 2022. The lyrics and message of "Blind" were so highly appreciated by the public that it resulted in "Blind" landing a spot on both the US Billboard Hot 100 and Billboard Global 200 as well as it is accredited as part of the success behind SZA reaching the number one spot on the US Billboard Hot 100 Songwriters chart.

Background

SZA released her debut studio album, Ctrl, in 2017. Primarily an R&B album that deals with themes like heartbreak, Ctrl received widespread critical acclaim for its candid approach to themes of heartbreak and SZA's incredible songwriting abilities, which eventually landed itself a spot on the top of the Billboard's Top R&B Album that year. Critics credit it with establishing her status as a major figure in contemporary pop and R&B music and pushing the boundaries of the R&B genre. Fans waited 5 years for another album, and even listed to Ctrl so many times that it landed the number one spot on the Billboard's Top R&B album again in 2022. Her next studio album was therefore highly anticipated, and with fans anxiously awaiting her return, Her next studio album was therefore highly anticipated, and she alluded to its completion as early as August 2019 or early 2020 during an interview with DJ Kerwin Frost, and that the album would be "even more of [her] being less afraid". When SZA collaborated with Cosmopolitan for their February 2021 issue, she spoke about her creative process behind the album's conception. She said: "this album is going to be the shit that made me feel something in my...here and in here", pointing to her heart and gut.

In 2020, SZA released "Hit Different" and "Good Days", marking her first solo songs since Ctrl and fueling anticipation for a new album. Between albums, she also collaborated with Kendrick Lamar in "All the Stars" which was featured in Black panther the album in 2018, with The Weeknd and Travis Scott in "Power Is Power" in 2019, with Justin Timberlake in "The Other Side" in 2020, and with Doja Cat in "Kiss Me More" in 2021. She also worked with the musical turned movie Dear Evan Hansen and was the co-writer and performer of the song "The Anonymous Ones" in the film in 2021. In addition, she released a few singles which would later appear on her album SOS, "I Hate U" and "Shirt".

At the end of the music video for "Good Days" was a snippet of "Shirt", a single from the upcoming album which was released in October 28, 2022. The music video for "Shirt", similar to that for "Good Days", featured a teaser of an unreleased song in the outro. When SZA appeared on Saturday Night Live on December 3, 2022, she debuted a live performance of "Shirt" alongside the unreleased song. The day after, she announced that the album, titled SOS, would be released in the same month. SZA used the unreleased song to soundtrack a trailer of SOS she posted to social media. The title of the song in question is "Blind".

Music and lyrics
"Blind" is an R&B and folk pop ballad. It is backed by lush pizzicato strings from acoustic guitar and viola, and its rhythm lacks a beat. SZA raps much of the lyrics in a staccato manner, changing her flow every few lines, and the song combines airy, sometimes manipulated vocals with several vocal runs (melisma).

The song was produced by Rob Bisel, Carter Lang, Will Miller, and Margaux Whitney, credited under her stage name Yuli. When conceptualizing how the music would sound, Yuli said that while they believed "Blind" fit the album's overall production, making it sound like much of SZA's past works was not their main priority. According to her, the reason it fit well with the album was because the song was made "from a place of love"; Yuli spoke to Genius, "We're not going to bring this hungry energy into the session. We're just going to create and be open and see how it comes out, and that's why I feel like the song has the energy it does." Out of the many producers who worked on songs for SOS, Yuli is the only woman. She felt special about this distinction, but at the same time, she was disappointed: "there’s not enough women doing this [in albums]. We need to change this."

Many songs in SOS deal with the conflict between SZA's longing for a lasting romantic relationship and a desire for a new life on her own—in tracks like "Blind", SZA ruminates on how toxic relationships have damaged her self-esteem. HipHopDX summarized the song as such: "SZA's need for outside validation clashes with her desire for self-approval in a way that reminds us self-love is a journey that may never end." The lyrics incorporate various wordplay and humorous references to several figures in pop culture. The list of figures she names includes Muhammad Ali ("now they calling me Cassius"), Bob Saget ("raunchy like Bob Saget"), Julia Stiles ("I ain't no Julia Stiles, this ain't no Last Dance"), and Jesus ("third day, pop out the tomb"). Vulture noted that the pop-culture references in "Blind" are few out of several in SOS, written by SZA to "add some spice to her already well-seasoned lyrics about growing up and bitch-ass men".

In a manifestation of a recurring motif across SOS, SZA admonishes a former partner for his bad behavior but, at the same time, acknowledges that her attraction for him still remains. She sings about having sex with him for his validation, and she recounts a time he brought out a gun when their car stopped at a red light as such: "I like all that violence, give me dysfunction."  Exploring themes of femininity, she discusses how her reputation has been reduced to her sexual encounters with ex-boyfriends, unable to escape her past because her "pussy precedes [her]". SZA's voice slows down and she switches to a falsetto vocal register in the chorus, in which she further addresses her self-worth and trust issues. She tells a prospective partner who wants to be with her that before they can get together, she needs to learn how to love herself first. One line reads "it's so embarrassing, all of the things I need living inside of me. I can't see it."

Release and reception
SZA took to Twitter to post the album's track list on December 5, 2022, and the album was released four days later, on December 9. Out of 23 songs, "Blind" appears as the sixth track. Upon its release, the song reached the top 40 in Australia, Canada, New Zealand, and the United States, with chart peaks of number 27, number 17, number 15, and number 12, respectively. It peaked at number 3 on the US Hot R&B/Hip-Hop Songs chart by Billboard; out of 20 songs from SOS that debuted in the United States, "Blind" was the third highest, behind "Kill Bill" and "Nobody Gets Me". On February 7, 2023, it, along with three other songs from SOS, were certified gold by the Recording Industry Association of America (RIAA) for surpassing 500,000 units sold.

In an NPR round-up of the best lyrics from 2022 songs, critic Kiana Fitzgerald chose one line from the chorus of "Blind", citing its relatability to anyone who has been in a relationship: "feelings of inadequacy, feelings of jealousy or trust issues or anything that you might have with someone that you're willing to deal with romantically. You know, we've all - or many of us, I should say - have been through relationships, situationships, dysfunctional functioning, whatever. And there's always some kind of tug and pull when it comes to love." About the lyrics in "Blind", Exclaim! wrote "SZA's ability to communicate her deepest feelings and insecurities in such an intimate and personal manner remains her greatest strength[...] her writing, even at its simplest, is effortlessly and immediately gripping."

Pitchfork reviewed the song "Blind" and characterized it as a "dazzling statement piece from her [SZA] new album SOS". They also describe SZA as "real and stylistically electric as ever on “Blind,” musing over lush violins and the delicate guitars of a Sufjan Stevens song, which tiptoe like a ballerina en pointe". They also discuss how this song reflects her classic themes of how hooking up with exes results in reputational damage and the question how long will vulnerability be rewarded with abandonment? This review highlights how in "Blind",  "SZA is messy and divine, indulging her desires and reeling from their consequence".

Credits 

 Solána Rowe lead vocals, songwriting
 Carter Lang songwriting, production, keyboards
 Rob Bisel songwriting, production, keyboards, acoustic guitar, engineering, mixing 
 Will Miller songwriting, production, keyboards
 Margaux Alexis Rosalena Whitney songwriting, production, viola
 Carson Graham engineering
 Katie Harvey assistant engineering
 Noah McCorkle assistant engineering
 Robert N. Johnson assistant engineering
 Dale Becker mastering

Note

Charts

Certification

Notes

References

2022 songs
Songs written by SZA
SZA songs